Slavcho Georgiev Chervenkov (born 18 September 1955) is a retired heavyweight freestyle wrestler from Bulgaria. He won silver medals at the 1980 Olympics, 1982 World Championships, and 1979 and 1980 European championships.

References

1955 births
Living people
Olympic wrestlers of Bulgaria
Wrestlers at the 1980 Summer Olympics
Bulgarian male sport wrestlers
Olympic silver medalists for Bulgaria
Olympic medalists in wrestling
Medalists at the 1980 Summer Olympics
20th-century Bulgarian people
21st-century Bulgarian people